West 25th–Ohio City is a station on the RTA Red Line in the Ohio City neighborhood of Cleveland, Ohio. It is located at the intersection of West 24th Street, Abbey Avenue and Lorain Avenue (Ohio State Route 10), diagonally across Lorain Avenue from the West Side Market.

History
The station opened on August 14, 1955 when the west side portion of the CTS Rapid Transit began operation.

When RTA began a program of rebuilding stations, including making them ADA compliant, West 25th Station was the first station renovated. The new $2.6 million station opened September 1992. The old utilitarian station was replaced with a station featuring a glass canopy with a bright red head house.

Station layout

Artwork
The 1992 station renovation included an art installation by Cleveland artist Don Harvey.

Notable places nearby
 Great Lakes Brewing Company
 Saint Ignatius High School
 St. John's Episcopal Church
 West Side Market

Gallery

References

External links

West 025th-Ohio City
Railway stations in the United States opened in 1955
Ohio City, Cleveland
1955 establishments in Ohio